Tenacious D is the debut studio album by American comedy rock band Tenacious D, released on September 25, 2001 by Epic Records. The album's polished production was a departure from the band's acoustic origins, due in part to the production of the Dust Brothers.
"Wonderboy" was the first single released from the album, followed by "Tribute". Both singles had music videos filmed for them, with the Liam Lynch-directed "Tribute" video achieving cult status. While Tenacious D did not achieve chart success after its release, it was certified platinum by the Recording Industry Association of America (RIAA) by the end of 2005. Despite only peaking at number 38 in the UK, it had sold 426,000 copies countrywide by 2006.

Conception
For their first album, they enlisted the help of drummer Dave Grohl, keyboardist Page McConnell of Phish, guitarist Warren Fitzgerald, and bass player Steven Shane McDonald. The Dust Brothers produced the album. The majority of the songs on their debut album stem from early versions as seen on their HBO TV series, Tenacious D. The record itself does not list the song titles on the back cover as is the convention but instead on the back cover of the jacket; therefore one must open the CD (after presumably buying it) to read them. This is perhaps to allow songs with expletives or words otherwise deemed offensive to escape censorship or omission.

Recording
The recording session for the album began with a two-day session at Neil Diamond's ArcAngel studio in Los Angeles where initial drum tracks were recorded. They were able to use the studio because Diamond had just appeared with Black in the film Saving Silverman, in which Black plays a Neil Diamond cover singer. "Diamond claims it was the Liberty Records studio," King says. "It's a really old place." At least one song was cut from the final release of the album. A studio recording of "Jesus Ranch," the final song from the HBO shorts (the closing credits feature the end of "The Road"), was omitted from the album because "it just didn't cut the mustard" (quoted by the D in the FAQ section of their website). The HBO version can be found on their DVD, The Complete Masterworks, and a recorded studio demo can be found on their 2002 EP, D Fun Pak.

Album cover controversy

The front cover features Black and Gass standing naked below the Devil. The pose is similar to that shown on some Devil tarot cards. Due to the Satanic nature of the cover, the album was briefly recalled from stores. The band performed in front of this at concerts.

Structure

The first single "Wonderboy", a biographical ballad, was critically well-received, with the BBC describing it as "endearing". In 2002, the video, directed by Spike Jonze, won a  Music Video Production Association for "Best Direction of a Music Video".

"Tribute", the second single from the album, discusses the "greatest song in the world" written to save the souls of Gass and Black from a demon but later forgotten. The song dropped guitar riffs from Led Zeppelin's "Stairway to Heaven" which had appeared in early versions. The single, the band's most successful, achieved Tenacious D's only chart top-ten peaking at number 4 in Australia. The video, directed by Liam Lynch, was voted by Kerrang! readers as the fifth best music video.

The third music video for "Fuck Her Gently", a song described as an "underground hit" and, according to Black, lauded by women's groups depicted an animated Black and Gass as cherubs by John Kricfalusi, the creator of Ren and Stimpy.

The album opens with "Kielbasa", a song discussing anal sex. The previously popular pseudo-science book, Dianetics is also mentioned, as well as Krishna. "Dio" is a tribute to Ronnie James Dio that calls for the singer to "pass the torch" on to Tenacious D. Black has said that this was a compliment as they could have asked others for the torch but "ultimately, we were bestowing an honor upon him." Reportedly, Dio approved of the song and let Tenacious D appear in the video for his single, "Push". In addition, Dio also appeared in the 2006 film Tenacious D in The Pick of Destiny, playing himself. "Explosivo" was originally intended as a tribute to Kurt Cobain.

Seven of the tracks on the album are comedy skits: "One Note Song", "Hard Fucking", "Inward Singing", "Cock Pushups", "Friendship Test", "Karate Schnitzel" and "Drive-Thru".

"Double Team" is another song on the topic of sex, in particular threesomes. "The Road" deals with groupies whilst touring. "Lee", named after their "no 1 fan" Lee, is a song from the short "The Fan", in which the band stalk their biggest fan, and sing an obsessive song about him. "Karate" is described as an aggressive song taken from the short "Angel in Disguise" in which Black and Gass fight. The song ends with Black saying the words 'donkey crap' in reverse audio. "Kyle Quit The Band", from "The Search for Inspirado", is a song which documents the band reuniting after breaking up.

"Rock Your Socks" with Tenacious D's desire to prove its classical and rock prowess through giving "a taste" of Bach's Bourrée in E minor from Suite in E minor for Lute, BWV 996, also used in another of Tenacious D song – "Classico". ("That is Bach and it rocks..."), popularized by one of the most famous classical guitarists: Andrés Segovia and prog rock band, Jethro Tull. The song features a shock comedy climax when lead singer Jack Black asks for the listener, in return for their troubles in playing to them, to perform a coprophilic ritual (referred to colloquially as a Cleveland steamer).

"Friendship" talks of Black and Gass' relationship. They sing of friendship being "rare".

In "City Hall", the longest song on the album – described as epic – lead singer Black calls for the legalisation of cannabis. The song is described by the band, and others as a rock opera.

Some critics have lamented that songs performed live and featured on the TV series were not included on the album. These include "Jesus Ranch" and "Cosmic Shame". Black accounted for the band's decision not to include "Jesus Ranch" saying "it just didn't cut the mustard". A demo recording of "Jesus Ranch" was later released on the D Fun Pak.

Touring
In support of the album, the band embarked on a national tour. All the songs were performed acoustically. The band covered Queen's "Flash" and The Beatles "You Never Give Me Your Money".

Tenacious D shows featured "City Hall" in the encore, a song about rioting against the government, and it played at shows until the events of September 11 attacks. The band initially removed the song from the set, but would eventually return it in the spring of 2002.

Critical reception

Tenacious D's first album garnered critical acclaim. Review aggregate website Metacritic gave the album a score of 85 out of 100, signifying "universal acclaim". Entertainment Weekly described the release as being "hilarious," and "no mere comedy record." AllMusic said it "rocks so damn hard" but it reflects on the lack of some of the songs from the HBO episodes. The A.V. Club wrote that Black and Gass manage "an odd simultaneous fusion of stupid and clever", while Time wrote, "The pleasures of Tenacious D... flow from a similar revelation: Black and Gass set themselves up as buffoons with titles like Karate Schnitzel, then proceed to defy expectations with precise guitars, polished vocal harmonies and slamming backup musicians".

Splendid magazine said of Tenacious D, "As entertainment, Tenacious D succeeds surprisingly well – for the first few listens.... The only long-term replay value you'll get from this record will come from playing it for friends who haven't heard it." Flak Magazine criticised the band's use of skits between songs, describing them as "distracting" and a "nuisance". In addition, Andy Gill of The Independent remarked that the album was full of "swearing and scatology" and was "bereft of even the slightest skidmark of humour".

Track listing

Personnel
Tenacious D
 Jack Black – lead vocals, rhythm acoustic guitar
 Kyle Gass – lead acoustic guitar, rhythm electric guitar, backing vocals

Additional musicians
 Dave Grohl – drums, guitar on tracks 1, 3, 4, 7, 8, 11, 18, 20, 21
 Steve McDonald – bass guitar
 Warren Fitzgerald – lead electric guitar
 Page McConnell – keyboards
 Alfredo Ortiz – percussion on tracks 3, 15, 18, 20
 Woody Jackson – sitar on track 1
 Andrew Gross – strings on tracks 4, 6
 Ken Andrews – guitar on tracks 3, 10, 11, 15
 John King – echoplex on track 7

Production
 Produced by The Dust Brothers (John King and Michael Simpson)
 Assistant engineer – Tony Scloss
 Mixed by Ken Andrews, except tracks 2, 5, 6, 9, 12, 14, 16, 17, 19, which were mixed by The Dust Brothers
 Assistant mixing engineer – Cameron Webb
 Engineer for Dave Grohl sessions – Adam Kasper
 Engineer at ArchAngel – Bernie Becker
 Recorded at The Boat (RCR Labs) in Silverlake, California
 Drums Recorded at ArchAngel Recording Studio
 Mixed at Larrabee North in North Hollywood, California
 Sound Castle Recording Studios in Los Angeles, California
 Record One Studios in Sherman Oaks, CA
 Mastered by Tom Baker for Precision Mastering in Hollywood, California
 Art direction and design: Brandy Flower
 Photography: Sean Murphy and Matthew Gass

Charts

Weekly charts

Year-end charts

Certifications

References

External links
 An article discussing The Boat, and the Dust Brothers
 An article looking at the recording techniques used by the Dust Brothers for Tenacious D

2001 debut albums
Tenacious D albums
Epic Records albums
Albums produced by the Dust Brothers